Trent Cooper (born 19 June 1974) is the senior coach of Fremantle Football Club in the AFL Women's (AFLW). He was announced as Fremantle's coach in June 2018 replacing Fremantle's inaugural AFL Women's coach, Michelle Cowan. 

After Fremantle went through the shortened 2020 AFL Women's season undefeated, Cooper was awarded the AFL Coaches Association Coach of the Year award.

Cooper previously played Australian rules football in the West Australian Football League for Swan Districts and Peel Thunder.  Outside of football, Cooper is a high school maths teacher, having taught at Wesley College and Chisholm Catholic College.

References

External links 

Get to know Trent Cooper, Today Tonight (21 February 2019)

Living people
1974 births
Australian rules footballers from Western Australia
Swan Districts Football Club players
Peel Thunder Football Club players
AFL Women's coaches
Fremantle Football Club coaches